Kariz-e Diklan (also Romanized as Kārīz-e Dīklan; also known as Kāvīz-e Dīklan and Dīglān) is a village in Fariman Rural District, in the Central District of Fariman County, Razavi Khorasan Province, Iran. At the 2006 census, its population was 37, in 7 families.

References 

Populated places in Fariman County